National Significant Numbers (NSN): six digits

Numbering in New Caledonia

See also 
 Telecommunications in New Caledonia

References

New Caledonia
Communications in New Caledonia